Ohad Maiman was born in Israel in 1977; upon completing his studies he served for 3 years in the Israel Defense Forces, traveled extensively in the Far East and South America, eventually settling down in New York City in 1999. In 2003, he graduated in philosophy and visual arts from Columbia University.  He currently lives and works in New York City.

Upon his graduation, Ohad Maiman has co-founded A Matter of Substance with Eytan Rockaway - a cross platform media/entertainment entity spanning the fields of music, film, and television.  In 2007, the company's focus shifted to a new TV Channel - Amos TV.

Maiman has shown his photography in various group shows, and a solo show at the Richard Avedon studio in December 2005. His photographs and writings from '04-'07 are now collected in the trilogy 'Theory of Wants', a book published October 2008 by Damiani Editore, along a solo show at Milk Gallery. He is represented in New York by Carlo Zeitschel, at CVZcontemporary. He is having a show in the Fall of 2011 at the Richard Young Gallery.

General references

References

External links
 Ohad Maiman's Official Website
 A Matter of Substance Website
 A Matter of Substance Television Website
 Special Design Project by Ohad Maiman

Israeli photographers
Living people
Year of birth missing (living people)